Barbara Hofmeister (born 1954) is a German backstroke swimmer who won one gold and one silver medal at the 1970 European Aquatics Championships. Between 1968 and 1971 she won eight national titles in the 100 m (1968–1971) and 200 m backstroke (1969–1971) and 4×100 m medley relay (1969).

After marriage she changed her last name to Stubbe. She works as a swimming coach at BSC Robben in Wilmersdorf, Berlin, and competes in the masters category.

References

1954 births
Living people
German female swimmers
German female backstroke swimmers
European Aquatics Championships medalists in swimming